Evan Mather (born 25 February 1970) is an American landscape architect, urban designer, and filmmaker. He is primarily known for his work in the genre of web film specifically the reconfiguration of personal histories and exploration of memory landscapes.

The most successful web-stream films, of course, are made with the format in mind. American film-maker Evan Mather's work, such as Icarus of Pittsburgh (2002), is a good example: densely packed with visual and aural information, his films seem made to be watched intently, in isolation and cocooned by headphones.

Background 
Mather was born in New Orleans and spent his childhood in Baton Rouge. He is a second-cousin of A Confederacy of Dunces author John Kennedy Toole. In 1993 he received a degree in landscape architecture from Louisiana State University. In 1995 he started the online video site Hand Crafted Films as a forum to experiment with the self-distribution of short films via the Internet. He gained early notoriety for his animated short films featuring Star Wars action figures. Most recently his films have focused on design and architectural issues, notably his 2009 documentary short film A Necessary Ruin about a geodesic dome ostensibly designed by Buckminster Fuller and its raison d'etre in Baton Rouge. A 2011 advocacy film, A Plea For Modernism, attempted to save a historic modernist elementary school in New Orleans. Mather's first feature film, From Sea To Shining Sea, was funded by Kickstarter and premiered at the National Building Museum in 2014. In 2017, Evan Mather was elevated to the ASLA Council of Fellows. In Fall 2021, his documentary essay film Sanctum was awarded a Professional Communications Award of Honor from the ASLA.

Filmography

References

External links
 
Evan Mather on Vimeo
Evan Mather on YouTube
 

Living people
American film directors
Landscape architects
1970 births